Club Social y Deportivo La Emilia is an Argentine sports club, located in the San Nicolás Partido of Buenos Aires Province. Its football team plays in the Torneo Argentino B, the regionalised 4th division of the Argentine football league system.

Titles 
Liga Nicoleña de Fútbol: (20)
1930, 1932, 1940, 1941, 1943, 1944, 1945, 1946, 1947, 1950, 1953, 1957, 1967, 1977, 2001, 2002, 2003, 2004, 2007 y 2011

See also
List of football clubs in Argentina
Argentine football league system

External links
Official website 

Association football clubs established in 1930
Football clubs in Buenos Aires Province